Zeiraphera gansuensis is a species of moth of the family Tortricidae. It is found in China (Inner Mongolia, Shaanxi, Gansu, Qinghai).

The larvae feed on Pinus tabulaeformis.

References

Moths described in 1993
Eucosmini